Jianlin Jack Cheng is the William and Nancy Thompson Missouri Distinguished Professor in the Electrical Engineering and Computer Science (EECS) Department at the University of Missouri, Columbia.  He earned his PhD from the University of California-Irvine in 2006, his MS degree from Utah State University in 2001, and his BS degree from Huazhong University of Science and Technology in 1994.

His research interests include bioinformatics, machine learning and data mining. His current research is focused on
protein structure and function prediction, 3D genome structure modeling, biological network construction, and deep learning with applications to big data in biomedical domains.

Dr. Cheng has more than 100 publications in the field of bioinformatics, computational biology, data mining, and machine learning, which have been cited thousands of times according to Google Scholar Citations. His protein structure prediction methods (MULTICOM) supported by the National Institute of Health were consistently ranked among the top methods during the last several rounds of the community-wide Critical Assessment of Techniques for Protein Structure Prediction (CASP). Dr. Cheng was a recipient of 2012 NSF CAREER award for his work on 3D genome structure modeling.

Bibliography (selected recent publications)

1. X. Deng, J. Cheng. Enhancing HMM-Based Protein Profile-Profile Alignment with Structural Features and Evolutionary Coupling Information. BMC Bioinformatics. 15:252, 2014. paper

2. T. Jo, J. Cheng. Improving Protein Fold Recognition by Random Forest. BMC Bioinformatics. 15(S11):S14, 2014. paper

3. R. Cao, Z. Wang, Y. Wang, J. Cheng. SMOQ: a tool for predicting the absolute residue-specific quality of a single protein model with support vector machines. BMC Bioinformatics, 15:120, 2014.  paper

4. T. Trieu, J. Cheng. Large-scale reconstruction of 3D structures of human chromosomes from chromosomal contact data. Nucleic Acids Research. 42(7):e52, 2014. paper

5. L. Sun, A.F. Johnson, J. Li, A.S. Lambdin, J. Cheng, J.A. Birchler. Differential effect of aneuploidy on the X chromosome and genes with sex-biased expression in Drosophila. Proceeding of National Academy of Sciences (P.N.A.S), USA. 110(41):16514-9, 2013. paper

6. M. Zhu, J. Dahmen, G. Stacey, J. Cheng. Predicting gene regulatory networks of soybean nodulation from RNA-Seq transcriptome data. BMC Bioinformatics. 14:278, 2013. paper

7. J. Eickholt, J. Cheng. A Study and Extension of DNcon: a Method for Protein Residue-Residue Contact Prediction Using Deep Networks. BMC Bioinformatics. 14(Suppl 14):S12, 2013. paper

8. D. Bhattacharya, J. Cheng. i3Drefine Software for Protein 3D Structure Refinement and its Assessment in CASP10. PLoS ONE. 8(7):e69648, 2013. paper

9. J. Eickholt, J. Cheng. DNdisorder: Predicting Protein Disorder Using Boosting and Deep Networks. BMC Bioinformatics. 14:88, 2013. paper

10. J. Li, X. Deng, J. Eickholt, J. Cheng. Designing and Benchmarking the MULTICOM Protein Structure Prediction System. BMC Structural Biology. 13:2, 2013. paper

11. Z. Wang, R. Cao, K. Taylor, A. Briley, C. Caldwell, J. Cheng. The Properties of Genome Conformation and Spatial Gene Interaction and Regulation Networks of Normal and Malignant Human Cell Types. PLoS ONE. 8(3):e58793, 2013. paper

12. P. Radivojac, W. Clark, T.B. Oron, A.M. Schnoes, T. Wittkop, A. Sokolov, K. Graim, C. Funk, K. Verspoor, A. Ben-Hur, G. Pandey, J.M. Yunes, A.S. Talwakar, S. Repo, M.L. Souza, D. Piovesan, R. Casadio, Z. Wang, J. Cheng, H. Fang, J. Gough, P. Koskinen, P. Toronen, J. Nokso-Koivisto, L. Holm, D. Cozzetto, D.W. Buchan, K. Bryson, D.T. Jones, B. Limaye, H. Inamdar, A. Datta, S.K. Manjari, R. Joshi, M. Chitale, D. Kihara, A.M. Lisewski, S. Erdin, E. Venner, O. Lichtarge, R. Rentzsch, H. Yang, A.E. Romero, P. Bhat, A. Paccanaro, T. Hamp, R. Kassner, S. Seemayer, E. Vicedo, C. Schaefer, D. Achten, F. Auer, A. Bohm, T. Braun, M. Hecht, M. Heron, P. Honigschmid, T. Hopf, S. Kaufmann, M. Kiening, D. Krompass, C. Landerer, Y. Mahlich, M. Roos, J. Bjorne, T. Salakoski, A. Wong, H. Shatkay, M.N. Wass, M.J.E. Sternberg, N. Skunca, F. Supek, M. Bosnjak, P. Panov, S. Dzeroski, T. Smuc, Y.A.I. Kourmpetis, A.D.J. van Dijk, C.J.F. ter Braak, Y. Zhou, Q. Gong, X. Dong, W. Tian, M. Falda, P. Fontana, E. Lavezzo, B.D. Camillo, S. Toppo, L. Lan, N. Djuric, Y. Guo, S. Vucetic, A. Bairoch, M. Linial, P.C. Babbitt, S.E. Brenner, C. Orengo, B. Rost, S.D. Mooney, I. Friedberg. A Large-Scale Evaluation of Computational Protein Function Prediction. Nature Methods. 10(13):221-7, 2013. paper

13. D. Bhattacharya, J. Cheng. 3DRefine: Consistent Protein Structure Refinement by Optimizing Hydrogen Bonding Network and Atomic Level Energy Minimization. Proteins, 81(1):119-31, 2013. paper

14. J. Eickholt, J. Cheng. Predicting Protein Residue-Residue Contacts Using Deep Networks and Boosting. Bioinformatics. 28(23):3066-3072, 2012. paper

15. M. Zhu, X. Deng, T. Joshi, D. Xu, G. Stacey, J. Cheng. Reconstructing Differentially Co-expressed Gene Modules and Regulatory Networks of Soybean Cells. BMC Genomics, 13:434, 2012.  paper

16. J. Cheng, J. Li, Z. Wang, J. Eickholt, X. Deng. The MULTICOM Toolbox for Protein Structure Prediction. BMC Bioinformatics, 13:65, 2012. paper

External links
 Dr. Cheng's Laboratory homepage.

American computer scientists
Living people
American people of Chinese descent
Year of birth missing (living people)